The thirteenth series of Dancing on Ice began airing on ITV on 17 January 2021. During the finale of the twelfth series, it was announced that Dancing on Ice had been renewed for another series. The series was once again filmed in the purpose-built studio at Bovingdon Airfield, which was set up for the tenth series. Phillip Schofield and Holly Willoughby returned as the hosts. Christopher Dean, Jayne Torvill and Ashley Banjo returned as judges for their fourth series, whilst John Barrowman returned as a judge for his second series respectively. 

Due to the COVID-19 pandemic, the series was filmed without a live audience for the first time in the show's history, and the judges were separated by perspex screens. The celebrities and their professional partners formed bubbles in order to work together safely.

This series holds the record for the most withdrawals in the show's history. Denise van Outen, Billie Shepherd and Jason Donovan were forced to withdraw from the series after suffering injuries, whilst Rufus Hound and Joe-Warren Plant both tested positive for COVID-19. It's also the first time that the show has had to use both of its reserve contestants, with Amy Tinkler and Matt Richardson joining the competition in weeks 3 and 4 respectively. 

On 15 February 2021, ITV announced that they had made the decision to postpone the sixth live show scheduled to air on 21 February in order to give the remaining contestants sufficient time to recover from any injuries, stating that 'The welfare of all of those involved is important to us and we felt it prudent to take a week's break at this juncture'. The episode was instead replaced with a pre-recorded special celebrating the most memorable moments in the show's history titled Dancing on Ice: The Greatest Show on Ice. The live shows resumed on 28 February.

On 26 February 2021, ITV announced that the current series would end on 14 March, a week earlier than originally planned, taking the number of live shows to eight instead of the usual ten.

The series was won by Sonny Jay and his professional partner Angela Egan.

Professional skaters
On 24 June 2020, it was announced that Alex Murphy, the show's reigning champion, had not been re-contracted for the upcoming series, and on 19 July 2020, that Brianne Delcourt would be leaving the show to spend more time with her husband, Kevin Kilbane, who she partnered last series. On 30 August 2020, it was announced that Alexander Demetriou and Carlotta Edwards wouldn't be returning, although Demetriou did still appear in some of the group numbers. On 7 October 2020, it was announced that Jess Hatfield, Oscar Peter and Tom Naylor wouldn't be returning either. They were all replaced by returning professionals Andy Buchanan and Robin Johnstone and new professionals Angela Egan, Klabera Komini and Yebin Mok, along with Joe Johnson and Karina Manta who will lead the professional group routines. Vicky Ogden, also a returning professional, joined the cast in week 4 following Matt Richardson's entry, but did not take part in the pre-recorded group routines. On 16 February 2021, it was announced that Hamish Gaman had been forced to withdraw from the competition after snapping a tendon in his hand. Therefore, his celebrity partner, Faye Brookes was re-partnered with Matt Evers, who had previously been partnered with Denise van Outen before they were forced to withdraw in week 3.

Couples
On 20 September 2020, Myleene Klass was announced as the first celebrity to be participating in the series. More celebrities were revealed in the following days, before the line-up was concluded on 4 October. On 26 January 2021, Denise van Outen was forced to withdraw from the competition after suffering three bone fractures and partially dislocating her shoulder. Van Outen was replaced by former Olympic artistic gymnast Amy Tinkler, who made her debut in the competition in week 3. Former Olympic skier and broadcaster Graham Bell was originally partnered with Yebin Mok, however after Mok sustained an injury before their first performance, Bell was re-partnered with Karina Manta. It was originally intended for Mok to return to the competition after her injury had healed, but Bell and Manta were eliminated before she had the opportunity to return. However, Mok reunited with Bell to perform in the final group routine.  On 3 February 2021, it was announced that Rufus Hound had tested positive for COVID-19, forcing him to withdraw from the competition. He was replaced by comedian and television presenter, Matt Richardson, who made his debut in the competition in week 4. On 6 February 2021, Billie Shepherd was forced to withdraw from the competition after suffering a head injury in training. On 12 February 2021, it was announced that Joe-Warren Plant had to withdraw from the competition after both he and his partner Vanessa Bauer tested positive for COVID-19. On 22 February 2021, it was announced that Jason Donovan had been forced to withdraw from the competition after suffering a back injury.

Scoring chart

 indicates the couple eliminated that week
 indicates the couple were in the skate-off but not eliminated
 indicates the couple received a golden ticket and was immune that week
 indicates the couple withdrew from the competition
 indicates the winning couple
 indicates the runner-up couple
 indicates the third-place couple
 indicate the highest score for that week
 indicate the lowest score for that week
"—" indicates the couple(s) that did not skate that week

Average chart
This table only counts for dances scored on a traditional 40-point scale.

Live show details

Week 1 (17 January)
 Head judge: Dean
 Group performance: "Shine"—Emeli Sandé (performed by professional skaters with Torvill & Dean)
"9 to 5"—Dolly Parton (Billie & Mark, Colin & Klabera, Faye & Hamish, Graham, Myleene & Łukasz and Sonny Jay & Angela)
"Run Boy Run"—Woodkid (performed by professional skaters)

In a new twist for this series, during Weeks 1 and 2, the judges have the option to award a Golden Ticket to one couple, which grants them immunity from the public vote.

The couple with the lowest votes from Week 1 will go up against the couple with the lowest votes from Week 2 in the Skate-off. 

Graham Bell and his partner Yebin Mok were meant to perform this week. However, due to Yebin sustaining an injury in training, Rufus Hound and his partner Robin Johnstone performed instead. Graham also skated solo in the group routine.

Golden Ticket vote
Banjo: Rufus & Robin
Barrowman: Rufus & Robin
Torvill: Rufus & Robin
Dean: Did not need to vote but would have voted for Rufus & Robin

Week 2 (24 January)
 Head judge: Torvill
 Group performance: "Glitterball"—Sigma feat. Ella Henderson (performed by professional skaters)
"Roll Over Beethoven"—Electric Light Orchestra (Denise & Matt, Jason & Alexandra, Joe-Warren & Vanessa, Lady Leshurr & Brendyn and Rebekah & Andy)
 "Don't Start Now"—Dua Lipa (performed by Joe Johnson & Karina Manta)
The couple with the lowest votes from this week will go up against Lady Leshurr & Brendyn, the couple with the lowest votes from Week 1, in the Skate-off. 

Due to Yebin Mok being injured, Graham Bell performed with Karina Manta this week.

Rufus & Robin did not perform in the group routine due to Rufus coming into contact with someone who tested positive for COVID-19 and was therefore forced to self-isolate for 10 days.

Golden Ticket vote
Banjo: Colin & Klabera
Barrowman: Sonny Jay & Angela
Dean: Sonny Jay & Angela
Torvill: Sonny Jay & Angela
Save Me skates
 Lady Leshurr & Brendyn: "Confident"—Demi Lovato
 Myleene & Łukasz: "Nothing's Real but Love"—Rebecca Ferguson
Judges' votes to save
Banjo: Lady Leshurr & Brendyn
Barrowman: Lady Leshurr & Brendyn
Dean: Lady Leshurr & Brendyn
Torvill: Did not need to vote but would have saved Lady Leshurr & Brendyn

Week 3 (31 January)
 Theme: Musicals
 Head judge: Dean
 Group performance: "When I Get My Name in Lights"—from Legs Diamond (all with John Barrowman)

Denise & Matt withdrew from the competition earlier in the week due to Denise's shoulder injury. They were replaced by Amy Tinkler and her partner Joe Johnson who performed for the first time this week.

As in the previous week, due to Yebin Mok being injured, Graham Bell performed with Karina Manta again.

Rufus & Robin did not perform this week as Rufus was still self-isolating after coming into contact with someone who tested positive for COVID-19.

Due to a family bereavement, Billie & Mark did not perform this week.

Save Me skates
 Rebekah & Andy: "My Life Would Suck Without You"—Kelly Clarkson
 Graham & Karina: "Many of Horror"—Biffy Clyro
Judges' votes to save
Banjo: Rebekah & Andy
Barrowman: Rebekah & Andy
Torvill: Rebekah & Andy
Dean: Did not need to vote but would have saved Rebekah & Andy

Week 4 (7 February)
 Theme: "Dance Week" – performances based on ballroom, Latin and other dance styles
 Head judge: Torvill
 Torvill & Dean performance: "Me and My Shadow"—Frank Sinatra & Sammy Davis Jr.

Rufus & Robin withdrew from the competition earlier in the week after Rufus tested positive for COVID-19. They were replaced by Matt Richardson and his partner Vicky Ogden who performed for the first time this week.

Billie & Mark withdrew from the competition the day before the live show after Billie suffered a head injury during training, and were not replaced.

Save Me skates
 Matt & Vicky: "Youngblood"—5 Seconds of Summer
 Colin & Klabera: "Leave Right Now"—Will Young
Judges' votes to save
Banjo: Colin & Klabera
Barrowman: Colin & Klabera
Dean: Colin & Klabera
Torvill: Did not need to vote but would have saved Colin & Klabera

Week 5 (14 February)
 Theme: Love Stories
 Head judge: Dean
 Group performance: "Can't Take My Eyes Off You"—Andy Williams (all)
 "Clair de lune"—Claude Debussy (performed by Mark Hanretty & Yebin Mok)
 Special musical guest: Rita Ora—"Bang Bang"

Joe-Warren & Vanessa withdrew from the competition on 12 February after they both tested positive for COVID-19. They were not replaced.

Jason & Alexandra did not perform this week due to Jason suffering from back pain.

Save Me skates
 Lady Leshurr & Brendyn: "Confident"—Demi Lovato
 Amy & Joe: "Final Song"—MØ
Judges' votes to save
Banjo: Lady Leshurr & Brendyn
Barrowman: Lady Leshurr & Brendyn
Torvill: Lady Leshurr & Brendyn
Dean: Did not need to vote but would have saved Lady Leshurr & Brendyn

Week 6 (28 February)
 Theme: Movie Week
 Head judge: Torvill
 Special musical guest: Marisha Wallace—"Reflection"—from Mulan (with professional skaters)
 Torvill & Dean performance: "Stand by Me"—Florence and the Machine

This episode was originally set to air on 21 February, however a decision was made to postpone the show for a week to allow the remaining couples to recover from any injuries.

Faye Brookes performed with her new partner Matt Evers for the first time this week after her original partner Hamish Gaman withdrew from the competition due to injury.

Jason & Alexandra withdrew from the competition earlier in the week due to Jason's back injury. They were not replaced.

Save Me skates
 Rebekah & Andy: "My Life Would Suck Without You"—Kelly Clarkson
 Lady Leshurr & Brendyn: "Candyman"—Christina Aguilera
Judges' votes to save
Banjo: Lady Leshurr & Brendyn
Barrowman: Rebekah & Andy
Dean: Lady Leshurr & Brendyn
Torvill: Lady Leshurr & Brendyn

Week 7: Semi-final (7 March)
Theme: Prop Week
Head judge: Dean
Group performance: "Mad World"—Jasmine Thompson/Make 'Em Laugh"—from Singin' in the Rain (performed by professional skaters)
 "Will You Still Love Me Tomorrow?"—Amy Winehouse (performed by Joe Johnson & Karina Manta)

Save Me skates
 Lady Leshurr & Brendyn: "Candyman"—Christina Aguilera
 Colin & Klabera: "Leave Right Now"—Will Young
Judges' votes to save
 Banjo: Lady Leshurr & Brendyn
 Barrowman: Lady Leshurr & Brendyn
 Torvill: Colin & Klabera
 Dean: Colin & Klabera
Despite having two votes each, Lady Leshurr & Brendyn were eliminated due to head judge Dean having the overriding vote.

Week 8: Final (14 March)
 Themes: Showcase, Favourite skate; Boléro
 Group performance: "Amazing"—Foxes (performed by professional skaters)
 Torvill & Dean performance: "Fly Me to the Moon"—Frank Sinatra

Ratings
Official ratings are taken from BARB. Viewing figures are from 7 day data.

References

External links
 Official website

Series 13
2021 British television seasons